Xanthaciura unipuncta is a species of tephritid or fruit flies in the genus Xanthaciura of the family Tephritidae.

Distribution
Guatemala, Colombia, Trinidad, Paraguay, Argentina, Brazil.

References

Tephritinae
Insects described in 1933
Diptera of South America